Alfredo Navarro (4 May 1868 – 17 May 1951) was a Uruguayan political figure.

Background

Navarro was a prominent member of the Colorado party in the 1930s.

He was a noted medical doctor.

Vice President of Uruguay

Navarro served as Vice President of Uruguay 1934–1938, and also President of the Senate of Uruguay. 

Navarro stepped down as Vice President in 1938, and was succeeded in that office by César Charlone.

Historical note

Navarro was the first person to hold the office of Vice President of Uruguay. The office dates from 1934.

See also
Vice President of Uruguay
Gabriel Terra
 Politics of Uruguay

References

Vice presidents of Uruguay
Presidents of the Senate of Uruguay
Uruguayan people of Spanish descent
1868 births
1951 deaths
University of Paris alumni
Academic staff of the University of the Republic (Uruguay)
20th-century Uruguayan physicians
Place of birth missing
Colorado Party (Uruguay) politicians